Antonio Valero Yubero (21 March 1931 – 3 October 2018) was a Spanish footballer who played as a defender.

Career
Born in Madrid, Valero played club football for RCD Córdoba and Sevilla.

He made one international appearance for Spain in 1957.

Later life and death
After retiring as a player due to injury, he worked as coach for the Sevilla youth teams. He died on 3 October 2018, at the age of 87.

References

1931 births
2018 deaths
Spanish footballers
Spain international footballers
RCD Córdoba footballers
Sevilla FC players
Segunda División players
Segunda División B players
La Liga players
Association football defenders
Footballers from Madrid